Simon (died 1701), of the Bagrationi Dynasty, was King of Imereti from 1699 to 1701. An illegitimate son of Alexander IV of Imereti, he was brought up at the court of Erekle I of Kartli, while Imereti was embroiled in the civil war among several claimants to the throne. In 1699, the Ottoman government sponsored a coup against King Archil of Imereti and installed Simon as king. The latter married Anika, daughter of the powerful prince Giorgi-Malakia Abashidze, but soon the prince and his second daughter Tamar (widow of Alexander IV) expelled Simon back to Kartli. With the support of Mamia III Gurieli, prince of Guria, Simon managed to stage a comeback and married Mamia's sister. However, Prince Abashidze promised Mamia the Imeretian crown and had Simon assassinated in his palace in 1701. Simon's death and the continuing power struggle in Imereti would trigger an Ottoman invasion of western Georgia in 1703.

References 

 Вахушти Багратиони (Vakhushti Bagrationi) (1745). История Царства Грузинского: Жизнь Имерети.
David Marshall Lang, The Last Years of the Georgian Monarchy, 1658-1832. New York: Columbia University Press, 1957.

17th-century births
1701 deaths
Bagrationi dynasty of the Kingdom of Imereti
Kings of Imereti
Eastern Orthodox monarchs
Illegitimate children of Georgian monarchs